Metastatic breast cancer, also referred to as metastases, advanced breast cancer, secondary tumors, secondaries or stage IV breast cancer, is a stage of breast cancer where the breast cancer cells have spread to distant sites beyond the axillary lymph nodes. There is no cure for metastatic breast cancer;  there is no stage after IV.

Metastases can occur several years after the primary breast cancer, although it is sometimes diagnosed at the same time as the primary breast cancer or, rarely, before the primary breast cancer has been diagnosed.

Metastatic breast cancer cells frequently differ from the preceding primary breast cancer in properties such as receptor status. The cells have often developed resistance to several lines of previous treatment and have acquired special properties that permit them to metastasize to distant sites. Metastatic breast cancer can be treated, sometimes for many years, but it cannot be cured. Distant metastases are the cause of about 90% of deaths due to breast cancer.

Breast cancer can metastasize anywhere in body but primarily metastasizes to the bone, lungs, regional lymph nodes, liver and brain, with the most common site being the bone. Treatment of metastatic breast cancer depends on location of the metastatic tumors and includes surgery, radiation, chemotherapy, biological, and hormonal therapy.

Typical environmental barriers in a metastatic event include physical (a basement membrane), chemical (reactive oxygen species or ROS, hypoxia and low pH) and biological (immune surveillance, inhibitory cytokines and regulatory extra-cellular matrix (ECM) peptides) components. Organ-specific anatomic considerations also influence metastasis; these include blood-flow patterns from the primary tumor and the homing ability of cancer cells to certain tissues. The targeting by cancer cells of specific organs is probably regulated by chemo-attractant factors and adhesion molecules produced by the target organ, along with cell-surface receptors expressed by the tumor cells.

Symptoms
The symptoms produced by metastatic breast cancer vary by the location of the metastases. For instance:
 Metastatic disease to the bone causes severe, progressive pain, and, less commonly, pathological fracture, erythema over the affected bone, and swelling.
 Metastatic breast cancer to the brain causes the following symptoms: persistent, progressively worsening headache, visual changes, seizures, nausea or vomiting, vertigo, behavioral and personality changes, and increased intracranial pressure.
 Metastatic disease to the liver causes jaundice, elevated liver enzymes, abdominal pain, loss of appetite, nausea, and vomiting
 Metastatic breast cancer to the lung or pleura causes chronic cough, dyspnea, abnormal chest X-ray, and chest pain.
 Other nonspecific systemic symptoms of metastatic breast cancer include fatigue, malaise, weight loss, and poor appetite.
Sometimes people with metastatic breast cancer do not have any notable changes or symptoms.

Bone
Roughly 70% of all patients living with advanced breast cancer have bone metastases Very often bone metastases can be successfully managed for a long time.

Brain
Brain metastasis is observed in 10% of breast cancer patients with metastatic properties Many of the breast cancer therapies (like targeted antibodies) fail to penetrate the blood–brain barrier, hence allowing for tumor recurrence in the central nervous system.

Pathophysiology
The main steps involved in the metastatic cascade of a cancer cell are:
Cell division and growth within the primary tumor
Invasion of the primary tumor border (basement membrane, or BM) and the tissue surrounding the tumor by the cell
Intravasation of the circulatory system: the cell enters the bloodstream or lymph channels.
The cell must survive the transit into the new environment, until it ultimately arrests in the microvasculature of the secondary site.
Extravasation to a distant site : The cell then invades into the BM of the target tissue.
Proliferation of the cancer cell at the metastatic site
Formation of a micrometastasis inside the secondary site
Progressive colonization, forming a life-threatening metastasis

The potential of a tumor cell to metastasize depends on its microenvironment, or “niche” interactions with local factors  promoting tumor-cell growth, survival, angiogenesis, invasion and metastasis.
This is explained by the seed and soil hypothesis.

Extracellular matrix degradation in cancer
Cell-cell and cell-ECM matrix adhesion, motility, and localised proteolysis are mediated mainly by matrix metalloproteases (MMPs). Degradation of the extracellular matrix begins the process of metastasis. The cell develops structures called invadopodia, which are highly concentrated in several proteases and have a highly dynamic actin cytoskeleton.

Mechanisms of metalloprotease action in cell motility involve:
 Proteolytic cleavage of growth factors, so they are readily available to cells not in direct physical contact
 Degradation of the ECM is facilitated by MMPs, so cells can move across tissues into nearby stroma.
 Regulated receptor cleavage to modulate migratory signaling

Most of these processes require a delicate balance between the functions of matrix metalloproteases (MMPs) or metalloprotease-disintegrins (ADAMs) and natural tissue inhibitors of metalloproteases (TIMPs). Regulated proteolysis is an important mechanism to maintain homeostasis. There is increased expression of protease systems in cancer cells, to equip them with the tools necessary to degrade the extracellular matrix and release growth factors or transmembrane receptors. MMP-2 is upregulated in the bone, and increased levels of  MMP-1 and MMP-19 are observed in the brain. This in turn, upregulates the signaling pathways necessary to provide increased cell adhesion, cell motility, cell migration, invasion, cancer- cell proliferation and survival.

Extracellular matrix components 
ECM-tumor cell interactions play a critical role in each of the events of the metastatic cascade. Interactions of the breast cancer cells with integrins, fibronectin, laminins, collagens, hyaluronan and proteoglycans can contribute to the metastatic process. Some of these proteins are discussed here in relation to breast-cancer metastasis.

Fibrinogen-Integrin 
Fibronectin is an extracellular glycoprotein that can bind to integrins and other ECM components like collagen, fibrin and heparan sulphate proteoglycans(HSPGs). Several different integrins bind to fibronectin. Fibronectin-integrin interactions are important in tumor cell migration, invasion, metastasis and cell proliferation by signaling through integrins. Integrin-mediated tumor cell adhesion to  ECM proteins can trigger signal transduction and cause upregulation of gene expression, increased tyrosine phosphorylytion of the focal adhesion kinase, and activation and nuclear translocation of mitogen-activated protein (MAP) kinases.

Heparanase 
Heparanase cleaves heparin sulfate chains of HSPGs, which have an extensive network with several proteins on the cell surface and ECM. The basic HSPG structure consists of a protein core to which several linear heparin sulfate (HS) chains are covalently O-linked; this acts as an assembly of different ECM proteins, including fibronectin, laminins, interstitial collagens, heparin-binding growth factors, chemokines and lipoproteins. HSPGs are prominent components of blood vessels. to HS stabilizes fibroblast growth factors (FGFs) and vascular endothelial growth factors (VEGFs) and prevents them  from inactivation. HS chains function as low-affinity co-receptors which promote dimerization of FGFs, aids in the sequestration of the growth factors (GFs) and causes activation of the signaling tyrosine kinase receptors even under low circulating concentrations of growth factors. Heparanase expressed by cancer cells participates in angiogenesis and neovascularization by degrading the polysaccharide scaffold of the endothelial BM, thereby releasing angiogenic growth factors from the ECM.

Tenascin 
The ECM protein tenascin C (TNC) is up-regulated in metastatic breast cancer. TNC is an adhesion-modulating extracellular matrix glycoprotein. It is highly expressed in tumor stroma and stimulates tumor-cell proliferation. It is hypothesised that TNC stimulates invasion via up-regulation of MMP-1 expression through activation of the MAPK pathway. MMP-1 (interstitial collagenase) cleaves collagen type I, II, III, VII and X. Therefore, tenascin C over-expression can significantly alter collagen in the ECM and influence tumor cell migration in cartilaginous tissues.

Endoglin
Endoglin is a cell-surface disulfide-linked homodimeric glycoprotein which binds to integrins and other RGD ligands and is a co-receptor for TGF-beta. Brain-metastatic breast-tumor cells express endoglin in large amounts. Endoglin-overexpressing cells develop large numbers of invadopodia; endoglin is localized in these structures. Endoglin expression in tumor cells contributes to metastasis by upregulating MMP-1 and MMP-19. MMP-19 cleaves components of the basal lamina such as collagen type IV, laminin 5, nidogen (entactin) and other ECM proteins such as tenascin, aggrecan and fibronectin. Therefore, endoglin over-expression alters the proteolytic balance of the cells to greater matrix degradation and increased invasive properties of breast cancer.

Mechanisms in bone metastases 
The primary extracellular matrix components and cell-surface receptors which aid in metastasis are:
Integrin signalling
Integrin αvβ3 (a cell-surface adhesion molecule) is important for tumor attachment, cell-to-cell communication between the breast tumor cells and the environment in bone, osteoclast bone resorption and angiogenesis. Integrin-mediated adhesion between cancer cells and osteoclasts in bone metastases induces phosphorylation of extracellular signal-regulated kinases (ERK1/2) in osteoclasts, which in turn induces osteoclast differentiation and survival.
Cancer cell-blood platelet interaction
Metastatic breast-cancer cells excrete lysophosphatidic acid (LPA) which binds to receptors on tumor cells, inducing cell proliferation and release of cytokines(IL-6 and IL-8, potent bone resorptive agents) and stimulating bone resorption. After the breast-cancer cells have left the primary tumor, they interact with the bone microenvironment and secrete osteolytic factors capable of osteoclast formation and bone resorption. Apart from the breast tumor cells, the resident stromal cells also contribute to tumor survival. Growth factors such as epidermal growth factor (EGF), fibroblast growth factor (FGF) and transforming growth factor beta (TGF-β) are implicated in the development and progression of metastatic breast cancer.
Matrix metalloproteinases (MMPs)
MMP-2 is the main metalloprotease secreted by breast-cancer cells or induced in the adjacent bone stroma; it plays an important role in the degradation of the extracellular matrix essential for metastasis. Tumor cells use MMP-2 secreted by bone marrow fibroblasts (BMFs). MMP-2 is stored in an inactive conformation in association with the cell surface (or extracellular matrix) of BMFs. Inactive MMP-2 present on the surface of BMFs is displaced by breast-cancer cells. Cancer cells can then use the proteinase to facilitate tissue invasion, which requires the degradation of connective tissue associated with vascular basement membranes and interstitial connective tissue. MMP-2 is unlike other MMP's as its activity is modulated by metalloproteases called tissue inhibitor of metalloproteases (TIMP) and membrane type 1 MMP (Korhmann et at. 2009)

Mechanism in brain metastasis
The brain is a unique organ for metastasis, since the breast-tumor cells have to pass the blood–brain barrier (BBB) to form micrometastases.

CD44
CD44 (a cell-surface transmembrane glycoprotein) is a receptor for hyaluronic acid, involved in cell adhesion by binding to specific extracellular matrix components. A proposed mechanism for the function of CD44 is to regulate the adhesion of circulating cancer cells in the brain to the endothelium at the secondary site with the help of a hyaluronate matrix ligand or by its cytoplasmic attachments to actin-associated proteins of the merlin/ezrin/radixin/moesin family.

Sialyl transferase (glycosylation modifications of gangliosides)
Cell-surface sialylation has been implicated in cell–to-cell interactions, and over-expression of a brain sialyltransferase in breast-cancer cells is a mechanism highlighting the role of cell-surface glycosylation in organ-specific metastatic interactions. Breast-cancer metastasis to the brain involves mediators of extravasation through non-fenestrated capillaries, complemented by specific enhancers of BBB-crossing and brain colonization.

Seed and soil hypothesis
The "seed and soil" hypothesis states that specific organs harbor metastases from one type of cancer by stimulating their growth better than other types of cancer. This interaction is dynamic and reciprocal, since cancer cells modify the environment they encounter. Tumor embolus = seed and Target organ = soil.

Workup
In the detection of bone metastases, skeletal scintigraphy (bone scan) is very sensitive and is recommended as the first imaging study in asymptomatic individuals with suspected breast-cancer metastases. X-ray radiography is recommended if there is abnormal radionuclide uptake from the bone scan and in assessing the risk of pathological fractures, and is recommended as the initial imaging study in patients with bone pain. MRI or the combination PET-CT may be considered for cases of abnormal radionuclide uptake on bone scan, when radiography does not give an acceptably clear result.

Treatment

Metastasis is a complex and interconnected multi-step process. Each step in the process is a potential target for therapies to prevent or reduce metastasis. Those steps which have a good clinical window are the best targets for therapy. Each event in metastasis is highly regulated and requires a synergistic activation of different ECM proteins, growth factors and so on. Although the occasional patient with metastatic breast cancer benefits from surgical resection of an isolated metastasis and most patients receive radiotherapy (often for palliation alone) during the course of their disease, the treatment of metastatic breast carcinoma typically involves the use of systemic therapy. There is no sufficient evidence on the benefits and risks of breast surgery associated with systemic treatment for women diagnosed with metastatic breast cancer.

Chemotherapy

Chemotherapy is one of the most important components of therapy for metastatic breast cancer. Therapy of choice is based on three variables; 1. the extent, pattern and aggressiveness at first presentation. 2. what stage of menopause the patient is at. 3. What receptor hormone the tumour has. Observation of metastases provides direct feedback on the effectiveness of the treatment and often a number of chemotherapy agents are tried sequentially to determine one that works. Adding one or more chemotherapy drugs to an established regimen in women with metastatic breast cancer gives greater tumour shrinkage on imaging but also increased toxicity.

Combination chemotherapy is often used in patients with metastatic breast cancer. Research suggests no difference in overall survival time between sequential single agent chemotherapy and combination chemotherapy. Sequential single agent chemotherapy may have a more positive effect on progression-free survival.

Taxanes are very active in metastatic breast cancer, and abraxane is approved for patients with metastatic breast cancer who either relapsed within six months of adjuvant chemotherapy or failed to respond to combination chemotherapy. This has a higher response rate than solvent-based paclitaxel (15% vs 8%). Abraxane can also deliver a 49% higher dose of medication than solvent-based paclitaxel; however, the side effects are severe and include chemotherapy-induced peripheral neuropathy. In women with metastatic breast cancer, taxane-containing chemotherapy regimens appear to improve survival and tumour shrinkage and decrease time to progression. Taxanes are associated with increased risk of neuro-toxicity and less nausea and vomiting when contrasted to non-taxane containing regimens.

Vinorelbine is also active in metastatic breast cancer. Eribulin was approved in the US in Nov 2010. A targeted therapy drug, Kadcyla, was approved in February 2013.  This antibody-drug conjugate targets only cancerous cells. It works by only releasing its toxic payload when triggered by a protein found in the cancerous cells in HER2+ breast cancer.  It has extremely low side effects using this target therapy method.

Platinum-containing chemotherapy regimens are known to be effective for treating a variety of different cancer types. In women with metastatic breast cancer who do not have triple negative disease, there is little or no survival benefit and excess toxicity from platinum-based regimens. However, in women with metastatic triple negative breast cancer, there may be a moderate survival benefit from platinum-based regimens.

Antitumour antibiotics are also used in metastatic breast cancer. Antitumour antibiotics work to prevent cancer cells multiplying by damaging them. A meta-analysis has demonstrated that women taking antitumour antibiotics as part of their regimen had an advantage in time to progression and tumour shrinkage, but also increased side effect such as cardiotoxicity, leukopenia and nausea.

Tamoxifen and other anti-estrogens

For estrogen-receptor-positive metastatic breast carcinoma the first line of therapy is often tamoxifen or another anti-estrogen drug unless there are liver metastases, significant lung involvement, rapidly progressive disease or severe symptoms requiring immediate palliation.

Radiotherapy
Radiotherapy is used in the treatment of metastatic breast cancer. The most common reasons for a patient with metastatic breast carcinoma to be treated with radiotherapy are:
Spinal cord compression. Spinal-cord compression is an oncological emergency, as untreated spinal cord compression may cause permanent paralysis or death. In breast cancer, spinal-cord compression occurs when a bone metastasis or spinal metastasis begins to push on the spinal cord this results in inflammation and, if untreated, spinal cord injury. Radiotherapy is an important component of therapy for cord compression secondary to metastatic breast cancer, along with corticosteroids and laminectomy.
Liver metastases. Typically, pain from liver metastases responds to chemotherapy and analgesia. However, in cases when chemotherapy is contraindicated or the liver metastases are refractory to chemotherapy (and pain medication fails to provide appropriate palliation of liver metastasis-related pain, radiotherapy should be considered; it may relieve pain and shrink the metastases, and perhaps extend survival in a subset of patients with a good response to radiotherapy.
Brain metastases. Brain metastases occur in up to 10–15% of breast-cancer patients, and often (but not always) occur late in the disease. They require urgent treatment; brain metastases may progress rapidly, and can suddenly produce life-threatening complications such as increased intracranial pressure, herniation of the brain, and seizures. Radiotherapy is essential in the treatment of brain metastases from breast cancer, as it halts tumor progression quickly and can induce a response in the majority of patients.
Bone metastases. The bones are a very common site of metastatic disease from breast cancer, and bone metastases can cause severe pain, hypercalcemia and pathologic fracture. Radiotherapy is indicated to prevent pathologic fracture; it is also part of postoperative treatment following repair of a pathologic fracture. Strontium 89, a radiopharmaceutical which is injected into the bloodstream, is under investigation for the treatment of bone metastases from breast cancer; there is evidence that it can relieve pain for up to three months after its administration. It is unknown whether or not it can prevent pathologic fracture, but it should be considered in patients who have three or more sites of painful bone metastases who cannot be treated with external-beam radiotherapy. In some patients with estrogen-receptor-positive breast carcinoma metastatic to the bone only, external-beam radiotherapy followed by tamoxifen or another anti-estrogen may be sufficient to control disease, at least  temporarily. In most cases, however, the combination of radiotherapy and hormonal therapy is not enough to maintain disease control, and chemotherapy is needed.

"Alternative" and "complementary" therapies
Some patients with metastatic breast cancer opt to try alternative therapies that are claimed to achieve healing effects similar to scientifically-tested medical approaches, but lack scientific evidence to support those claims.  Approaches that are considered alternative therapies when applied to cancer treatment include vitamin therapies, homeopathic treatments, extreme diets, chiropractic treatment and acupuncture. 

Some alternative treatments are harmful or even life-threatening. Amygdalin, an extract derived from apricot kernels, exposes the patient to cyanide. Bee venom can cause a life-threatening allergic reaction. Severe dietary restrictions such as Macrobiotic diets  can disrupt the body’s metabolism and cause dangerous weight loss. People should be aware that foods, vitamins, and other  treatments may interfere with the effectiveness of surgery, chemotherapy or radiation.  It is essential that patients work with their doctors and openly discuss possible effects of any treatment they are considering. Alternative and complementary therapies are not regulated by the U.S. federal government and may lack quality controls. 

While there is no evidence that any alternative treatments will cure cancer, there are treatments that may alleviate symptoms and improve quality of life for patients. When  integrated into a broader medical treatment plan these are sometimes referred to as  "complementary" or "integrative" therapies.  For example, patients may find hypnosis, massage, meditation, relaxation techniques, tai chi or yoga to be helpful for issues such as stress, pain, nausea, and difficulty sleeping.  Gentle exercise and a healthy diet can contribute to overall well-being and quality of life.  Some early research suggests that women who refrain from eating for at least 13 hours overnight are less likely to have a cancer recurrence, possibly due to differences in insulin, ketone or glucose metabolism.  As yet, the effects of nutrition and exercise on cancers are not well understood and some theories are controversial. 

Patients have been shown to face a greater risk of mortality if they refuse or delay scientifically-proven treatments in favor of alternative therapies. This is also true in the case of complementary therapies.  A study published in JAMA Oncology  compared the survival of those who used  complementary cancer treatments and those who used only the medical cancer treatments recommended by their doctors. They found that those who used complementary treatments during cancer treatment were more likely to refuse some of the conventional cancer treatments their doctors recommended, resulting in a higher risk of dying as compared to those who used no complementary treatments at all. Those most likely to choose complementary treatments were young, affluent, well-educated women with private insurance.

Experimental therapies
Treatment of metastatic breast cancer is currently an active area of research. Several medications are in development or in phase I/II trials. Typically new medications and treatments are first tested in metastatic cancer before trials in primary cancer are attempted.

Another area of research is finding combination treatments which provide higher efficacy with reduced toxicity and side effects.

Experimental medications:
 sorafenib a combined Tyrosine protein kinases inhibitor.

Scheduling of drug treatments and impact on results
Scheduling of drug treatments and combination treatment can have substantial impact on treatment efficacy.

Nanotherapies using nanoprobes
Nanomedicine is being studied, and there are several developments involving the targeting of cancer cells using nanoprobes. Some instances where nanoprobes are used to target specific tumor cells (based on the organ to which they have metastasized) are:
Chlorotoxin (a chemical derived from the deathstalker scorpion) binds to MMP-2 to cause endocytosis of the metalloprotease, thus reducing its activity. Chemically bonded iron-oxide nanoparticles were coated with about 20 molecules of chlorotoxin and targeted to brain-metastatic cancer cells. It was found that nanoprobes reduced brain-metastatic tumors in mice by 98%.
 Nanotherapy using antibodies to herceptin (coated on gold nanoparticles) has slowed down the growth and invasion of aggressive breast tumors in mice. Such therapies, targeted to specific cell types, is hoped to be useful in the future to develop better treatments to prevent or treat metastasis in breast cancer.

Central nervous system metastases

Clinically symptomatic CNS metastases are reported in 10–15% of patients with metastatic breast cancer; in large autopsy studies, up to 40% of women who died of metastatic breast cancer were reported to have at least one brain metastasis. CNS metastases are often viewed by patients and doctors as a late complication of metastatic breast cancer for which few effective treatments exist. In most cases, CNS involvement occurs after metastatic dissemination to the bones, liver and/or lungs has already occurred; for that reason, many patients already have refractory, terminal breast cancer by the time they are diagnosed with brain metastases. The diagnosis of brain metastases from breast cancer relies mainly on patient-reported symptoms and neuroimaging. The role of imaging in patients with suspected brain metastases is a very good modality to aid in diagnosis. According to Weil et al., 2005, neuroimaging such as Computed Tomography (CT) and Magnetic Resonance Imaging (MRI) prove to be very effective in the diagnosis of brain and central nervous system metastases.

Symptoms of brain metastases from breast cancer are:
 new-onset headache
 changes in mental status, cognition and behavior
 ataxia
 cranial neuropathy, which may cause diplopia and Bell's palsy
 vomiting and nausea
 deficits in sensation, motor function, and speech

Of all brain-metastatic patients, those with a controlled extra-cranial tumor, age less than 65 years and a favorable general performance (Karnofsky performance status ≥70) fare best; older patients with a Karnofsky performance status below 70 do poorly. Effective treatments for brain metastases from breast cancer exist, although symptomatic therapy alone may be chosen for those with poor performance status. Corticosteroids are crucial to the treatment of brain metastases from any source (including the breast), and are effective in reducing peri-tumoral edema and providing symptomatic relief. Chemotherapy has not been found to be effective in the treatment of brain metastases from breast cancer, due to the inability of most chemotherapeutic agents to penetrate the blood–brain barrier. Whole-brain radiation may provide a median survival of 4 to 5 months, which can be further extended by months with stereotactic surgery. Several non-randomized studies have suggested that stereotactic surgery may provide a nearly equivalent outcome, compared with surgery followed by whole brain-irradiation. Surgery tends to reduce symptoms quickly and prolong life, with an improved quality of life. Multiple metastases (up to three) may be removed surgically with a risk similar to that of a single lesion, providing similar benefits. Adjuvant radiotherapy follows surgical resection; this combined approach has been shown to prolong median survival up to 12 months, depending on the factors noted above. There is evidence that surgery may be useful in select patients with recurrent brain metastases. Mean survival from diagnosis of a brain metastasis varies between studies, ranging from 2 to 16 months (depending on involvement of the CNS, the extent of the extra-cranial metastatic disease, and the treatment applied). The mean 1-year survival is estimated at 20%. Improvements in the treatment of brain metastases are clearly needed.

See also 

breast cancer
metastasis
neoplasm
chemotherapy
Mouse models of breast cancer metastasis
Phyllodes tumour

References 

Breast cancer